The Vĩnh Tế Canal (or ) is an  canal in southern Vietnam, designed to give the territory of Châu Đốc a direct access to the Hà Tiên sea gate, Gulf of Siam.

Background 
Construction of the Vĩnh Tế Canal began in 1819, during the Nguyễn dynasty, a period that saw significant expansion and consolidation of the Vietnamese state. In particular, the Khmer regions of Siem Reap, Battambang, the Cardamom Mountain, the southern coast, and Hà Tiên were sites of contestation for both Siamese and Vietnamese rule.

After the construction of Thoại Hà Canal, Emperor Gia Long of Nguyễn dynasty ordered the mandarin Nguyễn Văn Thoại to dig a new canal along the Cambodian–Vietnamese border. The emperor's edict said: "this canal-digging project is tough, but its role in [our] national security and national defense is not small, we should accept the hardship so that our descendants would have the benefit".

Alongside other canals constructed in the early nineteenth century, the Vĩnh Tế Canal facilitated the advancement of the Vietnamese state into the Kampuchea Krom region of the Khmer world through both infrastructural and defense support.

Construction 
The construction of the canal was started in the end of 1819. The project used about 80,000 local Vietnamese and Khmer workers. After the death of Emperor Gia Long, the succeeding Emperor Minh Mạng continued the project.

Working Conditions 
The workers, especially the Khmers, were heavily exploited by being forced to do hard work, resulting in thousands of deaths from fatigue and consequent disease during the canal's construction. Further, Cambodian nationalists relate that Khmer workers who disobeyed orders were reportedly buried to their necks, with their heads used by the Vietnamese as cooking tripods for boiling tea. Consequently, the Vinh Te Canal became a symbol of Vietnamese mistreatment of the Khmer and was used later by the Khmer Rouge in anti-Vietnamese propaganda.

Rebellions 
Khmer sources documented the abusive working conditions to have sparked numerous Khmer-led rebellions, including one where several thousand Khmer workers led by a Buddhist monk ambushed an ethnically mixed Vietnamese military regiment. While the Khmer soldiers in the unit "refused to fire on the workers", the rebellion was eventually crushed by reinforcements sent by the Nguyễn viceroy in Sài Gòn.

When the construction was completed in 1824, Emperor Minh Mạng named the canal after Châu Vĩnh Tế, the wife of its builder Nguyen Van Thoai. Historian David Biggs suggests that the naming of the canal sought to honor her for "[arranging] aid for and [consoling] loved ones of workers killed by disease and fighting" resulting from its construction.

Biggs further suggests that the rebellions initiated by Khmer workers against the construction of these canals were not solely a product of poor working conditions, but were driven by a broader political consciousness. Given Khmer workers' awareness that projects like the Vĩnh Tế canal facilitated Vietnamese control over the Cambodia frontier, Biggs argues that the uprisings were a form of resistance against further Vietnamese expansion into Khmer territory.

References 

 

History of Vietnam
Canals in Vietnam
Ship canals
Buildings and structures in An Giang province
Geography of An Giang province
Canals opened in 1824